Mersin İdmanyurdu (also Mersin İdman Yurdu, Mersin İY, or MİY) Sports Club; located in Mersin, east Mediterranean coast of Turkey in 2015–16. Mersin İdmanyurdu football team has participated in 2015–16 season in Turkish Süper Lig. 2015–16 season was the 15th season of Mersin İdmanyurdu football team in Süper Lig, the top level division in Turkey. Team participated in 2015–16 Turkish Cup at third round.

At the start of the season Ali Kahramanlı was club president for eight years since 24 September 2008. Mesut Bakkal has started as head coach, later e resigned and Bülent Korkmaz replaced him after fifth round loss against Osmanlıspor. In the mid-season, Hüseyin Çalışkan was elected new president and agreed with Ümit Özat as the new head coach. Due to transfer bans by UEFA and then by TFF, no new transfers had been realized. Mid-fielder Murat Ceylan was the mostly appeared player during the season (33). Considering only the league matches stoppers Loret Sadiku and Milan Mitrović made the most appearances, 29, and Préjuce Nakoulma and Welliton were top goalscorers with 7 goals each.

2015–16 Süper Lig participation
2015–16 Süper Lig was played as "Spor-Toto Süper Lig" for Spor-Toto, a publicly owned betting institution, was sponsor for the season. The season named as "Hasan Doğan Season" after the name of former president of Turkish Football Federation who died at office in 2008. Start day of the season is 14 August 2015 and the end day is 22 May 2016. Champions was eligible for 2016–17 UEFA Champions League in Group stage. Runners-up were eligible for Champions League 3rd qualifying round. Third and fourth placed teams were eligible for 2016–17 UEFA Europa League at 3rd and 2nd qualifying rounds respectively. Starting from previous season 5th team in the league table was eligible for Europa League if the cup winner was among in first four placed teams. If otherwise, winner of 2015–16 Turkish Cup was eligible for Europa League at group stage. Bottom three teams were relegated to 2016–17 TFF First League.

Results summary
Mersin İdmanyurdu (MİY) 2015–16 Süper Lig season league summary:

Sources: 2015–16 Spor-Toto Süper Lig pages.

League table
Mersin İdmanyurdu (MİY)'s place in 2015–16 Süper Lig season league table:

Results by round
Results of games MİY played in 2015–16 Süper Lig by rounds:

First half
Mersin İdmanyurdu (MİY) 2015–16 Süper Lig season first half game reports is shown in the following table.
Kick off times are in EET and EEST.

Sources: 2015–16 Süper Lig pages.

Second half
Mersin İdmanyurdu (MİY) 2015–16 Süper Lig season second half game reports is shown in the following table.
Kick off times are in EET and EEST.

 Ricardo Pedriel Abdul Khalili
| stadium    = FT Stadium, Başakşehir, İstanbul
| attendance = 1.182
| referee    =  
| result     = L
}}

Sources: 2015–16 Süper Lig pages.

2015–16 Turkish Cup participation
2015–16 Turkish Cup was played for 54th time as Ziraat Türkiye Kupası for sponsorship reasons. The cup was played by 159 teams in three stages. In the first stage, a preliminary qualification round and three elimination rounds were played in one-leg elimination system. In the second stage, 32 teams played two-legs round-robin games in 8 groups, 4 in each. In the third stage, knock-out games were played in two-leg elimination system. Mersin İdmanyurdu attended the cup in 3rd elimination round and eliminated Second League (third division) team Fatih Karagümrük after penalties and promoted to group stage. In group stage MİY took place in Group D. After the group games İdmanyurdu became 3rd in Group D and was eliminated. Galatasaray won the Cup for 17th time.

Cup track
The drawings and results Mersin İdmanyurdu (MİY) followed in 2015–16 Turkish Cup are shown in the following table.

Note: In the above table 'Score' shows For and Against goals whether the match played at home or not.

Game details
Mersin İdmanyurdu (MİY) 2015–16 Turkish Cup game reports is shown in the following table.
Kick off times are in EET and EEST.

Source: 2015–16 Turkish Cup (Ziraat Türkiye Kupası) official TFF page. Attendance data from ntvspor.net.

Management
At the start of the season, president Ali Kahramanlı continued in his position which he held in 2008. In the mid-season Hüseyin Çalışkan who was former  president and a businessman from Mersin was elected president. Former president Hamit İzol was declared honorary president. Club address was: Palmiye Mah. Adnan Menders Bl. 1204 Sk. Onur Ap. K.2 D.3 Yenişehir/Mersin.

Club management
On 11 January 2016 club congress was held and a new executive committee took over the club:
 Executive committee: Hüseyin Çalışkan (president); Senan İdin, Özgür Sanal (vice -presidents); Beşir Acar (deputy vice-president); Abdi Kurt, Mahsum Sevimli (General Secretary); Hikmet Kaya, Vedat Yüksel (football division); Sedat Aydöner (financial affairs), Akif Serin (public institutions and foreign affairs); Sabri Tekli (the 1925 project);  Mehmet Can Duman, Abdi Öztürk, Vedat Yüksel (amateur divisions and youth setup); Mahsum Sevimli (legal affairs); Murat Altındere (spokesman and trademark); Metin Yıldıran (ads, sponsorships and funding);  Engin Şahin (facilities, investments, projects); Cihat Gündoğar (spectators).
President Kahramanlı resigned due to health problems and financial difficulties after eight years on 9 December 2015. Later he turned back until the new congress on 11 January 2016. Before his resignation the club management was as follows:
 Executive committee: Ali Kahramanlı (president); Senan İdin (vice-president); Mehmet Özgür Sanal (vice-president); Beşir Acar (deputy vice-president); Sedat Aydöner (financial affairs); Hikmet Kaya (football division and youth setup); Ahmet Turan Serttaş (professional football); Adem Serin (General secretary); Şerafettin Kadooğlu (deputy vice-president); İlkay Mahanoğlu (legal affairs); Ahmet Nusret Canözkan (advertisements, sponsorships and fund searching); Mustafa Yüksel Güngör and Murat Harman (facilities, investments and projects); Ayhan Erdem (spokesman); Metin Yıldıran (deputy vice-president).
 Administrative personnel: Mesut Bilir (general coordinator); Murat Öğ (general director); Duygu Gürani (accreditations); Özcan Ulusoy (bookkeeping); Rıfkı Çınar (press relations); Barış Köksal (social media); Mustafa Kaya (security); Ökkeş Aybar (A team driver).

Coaching team
2015–16 Mersin İdmanyurdu head coaches

Note: Only official games were included.

Other coaching team members were as follows:
 Mesut Bakkal's team: Ümit Bozkurt (trainer), Zafer Özgültekin (goalkeeper coach);
 Bülent Korkmaz's team: Çağdaş Çavuş (trainer), Ümit Bozkurt (trainer), Zafer Özgültekin (goalkeeper coach), Murat Kuyucuoğlu (trainer);
 Ümit Özat's team: Önder Engin (trainer), Gökhan Tokgöz (trainer), Sonkan Konak (youth team).
 Tamer Sivrikaya (trainer), Serkan Damla (trainer), Nezih Ali Boloğlu (goalkeeper coach), Eren Matyar (U21 team), Muzaffer Tozlu (U21 team), Ali ÖmerSakarya (U19 team), Sedat Hazımoğlu (U17 team), Mesud Cömert (U16 team), Tarkan Özyılmaz (U15 team), Burhan Baygın (U15 team), Oğuzhan Doğar (U15 team), Önal Arıca (U14 team), Ahmet Edremit (physician), Serkan Sağlık (physiotherapist), Abdulkadir Topal, Kemal Gürgez, Ersoy Şenel Oktay Baş (masseurs).

2015–16 squad
Appearances, goals and cards count for 2015–16 Süper Lig and Türkiye Kupası (2015–16 Turkish Cup) games. Only the players who appeared in game rosters were included. Player's are listed in order of appearance. MİY could not signed with new players in Summer 2015, because FIFA decided on two season transfer ban for MİY due to termination of the contract of the MİY's former player David Bičík. The ban was applied for 2015 Winter and Summer transfer seasons. Although the UEFA ban was removed after two transfer seasons, this time TFF did not open transfer table due to financial difficulties. Therefore, no new transfers became possible in 2015–16 season.

Sources: TFF club page and maçkolik team page.

U-21 and U-19 teams

Mersin İdmanyurdu U-21 team participated in U21 League Süper Lig and U19 team in Elite U19 League.

See also
 Football in Turkey
 2015–16 Süper Lig
 2015–16 Turkish Cup

Notes and references

2015-16
Turkish football clubs 2015–16 season